La Para (also named La Pare or La Tornette) is a mountain of the western Bernese Alps, overlooking Les Diablerets in the canton of Vaud.

References

External links
 La Para on Hikr

Mountains of the Alps
Mountains of Switzerland
Mountains of the canton of Vaud